St Bernard's Catholic Grammar School (formerly St Bernard's Convent School) is an academically selective Roman Catholic state grammar school on Langley Road, Slough. It was previously designated as a Humanities College. The student body is divided into four different houses - Annay, Clairvaux, Cîteaux and La Plaine. The houses are named after various monastic houses, relating to the school's history. The school's motto is "Dieu Mon Abri", which means "God is my Shelter". The crest is a diamond, with three parallel, diagonal, swords on a blue background. The school has been given an "outstanding" by Ofsted and its recent 2017, 2018 and 2019 results place it academically within in the top 1% of the country.

History

Aldin House
The school is built around and includes Aldin House, which dates from about 1860. Nikolaus Pevsner believed the house was built by and for Charles Aldin.

It was widely believed that the house was built for Angela Burdett-Coutts but that she never lived there as Queen Victoria did not approve of her marriage to the much younger William Lehman Ashmead Bartlett. The marriage did not take place until 1881, however, when the house had already entered use as a school so Pevsner's version seems more plausible. In 1869, John Hawtrey opened St Michael's School in Aldin House. The school remained there for 14 years, with pupils including the future Prime Minister, Stanley Baldwin. The original chapel was built in 1875, and dedicated as an Anglican chapel by Bishop Samuel Wilberforce of Oxford. After St. Michael's left, the site was used for a year by the Welsh Charity School of Ashford, Middlesex while their usual buildings were modified, and subsequently St George's School, Southwark used the building for the same purpose. The Jesuit Fathers bought the house and used it as a college for eight years.

St Bernard's
Aldin House was bought (and renamed St Bernard's) by the Bernardine nuns in 1897. Since then, various additions have been made to the building. Beginning with a school for 12 French students, the educational work of the Bernardines has evolved enormously. In 1904, day girls were first admitted to the school, leading to the development of a girls' grammar school. The school became co-educational in 1989. and now forms a large mixed Voluntary Aided Grammar School for some 900 students, aged 11–18.

In 1906, a nearby house was bought and opened as St Joseph's day school "for children of all denominations". In 1945, St Joseph's formally merged with St Bernards, becoming the preparatory school. In the 1970s and 1980s, the prep school moved to a new site where it continues today as an independent fee paying school for about 200 pupils, although it shares a badge with the state supported grammar school. Until August 2006, the school was also the home to nuns of the Bernardine order, who gave up their home for the school, and a few gave up their time to teach. At the time of the foundation, the convent was right in the countryside, with nothing but fields separating it from Windsor Castle.

The convent, set in extensive grounds with fields, a vegetable garden, orchard and cemetery, provided an oasis of peace and prayer for those who visit. A large house - Stella Maris - in the monastery grounds served as a small pastoral centre. The Bernardines have always wished to co-operate with the pastoral life of the Church, and this was one such way of collaborating with the Church in the Diocese of Northampton. The nuns left the school in mid-2006.

The school received a brand new Cafe in the Summer of 2019.

Merger plans
In October 2008 the schools confirmed that the Diocese of Northampton had approached the Department for Children, Schools and Families with a proposal to merge St. Bernard's Catholic Grammar School with St. Joseph's Catholic High School to form an all-ability Catholic Academy on the St Bernard's site.
The proposal is supported by Slough Borough Council and the governing bodies of the two schools. The plan would result in the first closure of a grammar school since 1997. In March 2009 the DCSF responded with a Statement of Intent letter, inviting the Council to develop concrete plans (an Expression of Interest document), with a planned opening date of September 2011.

A group of concerned parents calling themselves "Faith and Choice Together (FaCT)" had created a web site (Save St Bernard's) to highlight the opposition to the plan, and put forward three candidates who were elected as parent governors. They collected more than 1000 signatures on a petition. The parent's campaign was supported by the National Grammar Schools Association. In 2010 it was announced that the plans to merge the two schools had been abandoned. This was partially down to the large number of people, be it staff, students or parents who were opposed to the plans.

Claire Gill 
On 28 June 2006 Claire Gill, a student at St Bernards hanged herself in a school cubicle after writing a suicide note. Police said bullying was not involved and did not treat the death as suspicious.

Traditions

GA
The most known tradition of the school is Guardian Angels. On this day, the males exchange ties with the females and a majority of the day are special events. Some of these events include: football matches between staff and students, netball match between staff and students and the most notable: the assembly ran by the Sixth Form. The day is entirely planned by students -to give thanks for all their hard work- and staff are provided free food and other services.

Forms
There are about 1000 pupils, with five form groups in each year group; A, B, R, S and W (W being introduced towards the end of 2019 to support the growing number of students). The letters correspond to the founder of the house (e.g. Citeaux, founded by Robert XXX, becomes R, and you get 7R, 8R, 9R etc.)

Years 12 and 13 are organised into roughly six forms apiece, though this can vary from year to year. Each form is named after the various monastic houses of the founding Bernadine Sisters. For example, 12Br and 13Br are dedicated to the Brownshill Monastery in Stroud, Gloucestershire; 12Mi and 13Mi are dedicated to the Mikkabi Monastery in Inasa District, Shizuoka Prefecture, Japan.

Notable students

Headteachers
 Dame Marie Hilda 
 Mother Dorothy
 Sr Mary Anthony (1969 – 1982)
 Sr Mary Stephen (1983 – 1998)
 John McAteer MA (1998 – 2013)
 Michael Stimpson (2013 – 2017)
Paul Kassapian (2017–present)

References

External links
The Bernardine Community
History of St Bernard's School

Grammar schools in Slough
Voluntary aided schools in England
Catholic secondary schools in the Diocese of Northampton
Educational institutions established in 1897
1897 establishments in England